Colobothea destituta is a species of beetle in the family Cerambycidae. It was described by Bates in 1865.

References

destituta
Beetles described in 1865